Pomara massacre refers to the killings of 13 unarmed Bengali Hindus of Pomara Union in Chittagong District of East Pakistan on 14 September 1971. The Pakistan army buried alive 13 Bengali Hindus in the Pomra reserved forest.

Background 
The Pomara Union falls under the Rangunia Upazila of Chittagong District. The mass killing site is about 50 metres from the Gochra Chaumohani railway station and 25 km from Chittagong. It is situated behind the Pomara High School just beside the Pomara reserved forest.

Killings 
On 14 September a 50-60 strong contingent of the Pakistan army attacked Madhuram Talukdarpara, and launched a barbarous assault on the men, women, children and the elderly. Eighteen villagers were tied with ropes and then beaten and dragged to the army camp near the Pomra reserved forest. Hundreds of villagers accompanied them to the camp to secure their release from the army officers. The eldest five of the captives were released in half dead condition. The rest were made to dig a grave where they were buried alive.

Aftermath 
A few days later some locals attempted to exhume the corpses, but gave up due to heavy stench. Soon the mass grave became covered with shrubs and the area became a grazing ground for the cattle. At present seasonal vegetables are cultivated at the mass killing site.

References 

1971 Bangladesh genocide
Massacres of Bengali Hindus in East Pakistan
Persecution of Hindus
Persecution by Muslims
1971 in Bangladesh
Massacres in 1971
Massacres committed by Pakistan in East Pakistan
September 1971 events in Asia